Void Dweller was the first studio album recorded by Eon, released in 1992.

Track listing

References

1992 debut albums
Eon (musician) albums